This is a list of public art in Newark, New Jersey, in the United States. This list applies only to works of public art on permanent display in an outdoor public space and does not include artworks in museums. Public art may include sculptures, statues, monuments, memorials, murals, and mosaics. Many statues were erected in the early 20th century during the City Beautiful Movement and were concentrated in the city's original three commons, or town squares, and the county courthouse.

List

Newark Light Rail

Sports
In addition to aforementioned 2009 stainless steel sculpture of a hockey player Jon Krawczyk also created The Salute, a statue of the longtime New Jersey Devils goaltender Martin Brodeur, installed outside Prudential Center in 2016.

A bronze statue, created by sculptor Thomas Jay Warren, was dedicated to the memory of Althea Gibson in Branch Brook Park in March 2012 In June 2012, a life-size bronze statue of Roberto Clemente by sculptor Susan Wagner was also unveiled in the park.

See also
Public Sculpture in Newark, New Jersey Multiple Property Submission
Washington Park (Newark)
Kea Tawana
List of public art in Jersey City, New Jersey

References

Newark, New Jersey
 
Public art